Álamos Municipality is a municipality in south-western Sonora, Mexico.
It includes the town of Álamos.

It is one of the 72 municipalities of the Mexican state of Sonora, located in the southeastern part of the state. Its municipal seat is the Magical Town of Álamos. Other important localities are: San Bernardo, El Mocúzarit (Conicárit), Los Tanques, among others. There are also a number of communities with the presence of Guarijíos and Mayos indigenous peoples, such as Mesa Colorada, Guajaray, Bavícora, El Paso, and Basiroa.

It was decreed an independent municipality in 1813, at the same time as another large number of municipalities, in the first political division of Sonora as a state, through the Spanish Constitution of Cádiz. At that time the municipality ceased to be part of the province of Sinaloa. According to the Population and Housing Census 2020 carried out by the National Institute of Statistics and Geography (INEGI), the municipality has a total population of 24,976 inhabitants, has an area of 6,426.22 km2, being the sixth largest municipality in Sonora. Like most municipalities in the state, the name was given by its municipal seat. Its Gross Domestic Product per capita is US$6,800 and its Human Development Index (HDI) is 0.7560.

Government

Municipal presidents

References

Municipalities of Sonora